Sir George Thomas, 1st Baronet (died 1774) was an English colonial government official, who served as Governor of the Leeward Islands.

Thomas served as Deputy Governor of the Province of Pennsylvania between 1738 and 1747. In 1753 he became Governor of the British Leeward Islands, serving in the position until 1766. Upon his return to England, he was created a baronet, of Yapton in the County of Sussex in the Baronetage of Great Britain, on 6 September 1766.

He married Lydia, daughter of John King Esq. of Antigua.

Sir George Alan Thomas, 7th Baronet was the last of this lineage, who had no sons; this baronetcy terminated with his death in 1972.

References

Year of birth unknown
1774 deaths
Baronets in the Baronetage of Great Britain
Colonial governors of Pennsylvania
Governors of the Leeward Islands